Rocky is an American sports drama multimedia franchise created by Sylvester Stallone, based on the life of Chuck Wepner, which began with the eponymous 1976 film and has since become a cultural phenomenon, centered on the boxing careers of Rocky Balboa, his rival Ivan Drago, and protégé Donnie Creed. The franchise has been expanded into various films and, with a total worldwide gross of $1.7 billion, is one of the highest-grossing media franchises.

The original film (Rocky) was written by Stallone and directed by John G. Avildsen, and was followed by the sequels Rocky II (1979), Rocky III (1982), Rocky IV (1985), Rocky V (1990), and Rocky Balboa (2006). Stallone wrote and directed four of the five sequels, with Avildsen returning to direct Rocky V. All six films were distributed by Metro-Goldwyn-Mayer. A spin-off and sequel film series Creed followed the sixth film, with the films Creed (2015), Creed II (2018), and Creed III (2023). The series stars Michael B. Jordan as boxer Donnie Creed and Stallone as his trainer. The Creed films were directed by Ryan Coogler, Steven Caple Jr., and Jordan respectively. 

The franchise will continue with a fourth Creed film, while a Drago film, a seventh Rocky film, a prequel television series, an Amara Creed centered television series, and various other spin-offs are in active development.

Rocky, Rocky III, and Creed were nominated for Academy Awards, with the first winning Best Picture, Best Director for Avildsen, and Best Film Editing, and is considered one of the greatest sports films of all time. Stallone was nominated for Best Actor and Best Supporting Actor for his performance in the first film and Creed, respectively. Rocky has influenced landmarks and popular culture; the entrance to the Philadelphia Museum of Art have become known as the Rocky Steps while phrases like "Yo Adrian!" and "If he dies, he dies" have become part of lexicon or widely memed. Balboa is also considered one of the most iconic fictional characters, and the franchise is closely linked with its successful theme songs, including "Gonna Fly Now", "Eye of the Tiger", and "Burning Heart".

Films

Rocky (1976)

Rocky Balboa (Sylvester Stallone) is a small-time boxer who seems to be going nowhere in life, as he works day-in and day-out as a collector for a loan shark and fights in sleazy clubs for low pay rewards, for which Rocky is mocked and told that he's nothing but a 'bum', especially by gym trainer Mickey Goldmill (Burgess Meredith). At the same time, Rocky successfully courts Adrian Pennino (Talia Shire), a painfully shy woman with an alcoholic brother, Paulie (Burt Young). But when the world heavyweight champion boxer Apollo Creed (Carl Weathers) chooses Rocky at random as his opponent in a title fight, Rocky realizes he now has the chance to prove that he's not worthless. With Adrian's support, sponsorship offers with the help from Paulie, and Mickey becoming his trainer and manager, Rocky is determined to go the distance with Creed and fights for his self-respect.

Rocky II (1979)

Soon after proving himself, even with a split decision loss to Apollo Creed, Rocky expects the good life to follow. He marries Adrian and begins spending the money he earned from the match. But after he fails at both endorsements and a series of low wage jobs, Rocky realizes the only way he can survive is to begin boxing again. Creed on the other hand, faces criticism from fans to overcome the fight. As a result, he publicly taunts Rocky into a rematch, for which Rocky trains once again with Mickey. In the fifteenth round, Rocky knocks Creed to the ground, falling to the canvas himself in the process. Both fighters struggle to get to their feet, but only Rocky is successful. For the first time, Rocky is declared the World Heavyweight Champion; even Apollo shows respect for him as he regains his support from fans for doing a fair fight.

Rocky III (1982)

After winning the heavyweight title, Rocky takes advantage of his newfound wealth and fame, appearing in multiple advertisements and television programs, and relishing his new celebrity status. After defending the title multiple times, he is prepared to retire, but the number one contender, James "Clubber" Lang (played by Mr. T), challenges Rocky publicly. Rocky, after dealing with Mickey's heart attack before the fight, is overpowered by the stronger, hungrier Lang and is knocked out in the second round. Mickey dies after the fight, and former rival Apollo Creed steps in, training Rocky to fight in Creed's old style (in his old Los Angeles gym) and to use more guile and skill. In the rematch, Rocky outboxes Lang, tiring the stronger fighter out and eventually knocking him out in the third round. After the fight, Apollo calls in his "favor" for training Rocky, which is a one-on-one match between the two of them with no cameras, no media, just man vs. man in the gym. The film ends as they each throw their first punch.

Rocky IV (1985)

After winning back his title from Clubber Lang, Rocky continues to live the good life, now that he and Apollo are good friends. However, a new fighter from the USSR, Ivan Drago (played by Dolph Lundgren), has emerged and challenges Rocky to an exhibition match. Apollo fights instead, and the beating he takes from Drago ends with Apollo dying in Rocky's arms in the ring as Drago coldly watches. To avenge Apollo, Rocky challenges Drago to a match, which is to be held on Christmas Day in Moscow. In a montage replete with symbolism, Rocky is shown training in a remote cabin in Siberia with the help of Creed's old trainer Duke, his brother-in-law Paulie, and eventually Adrian, doing exercises such as chopping wood, lifting rocks, running in the snow and climbing a mountain, while Drago is seen in an advanced training facility running on treadmills, utilizing weightlifting machines and injecting steroids to boost his strength. During the fight, Rocky takes the worst beating of his life but refuses to fall. He eventually wins over the foreign crowd with his display of courage and determination, and he knocks Drago out with seconds left in the final round.

Rocky V (1990)

In the aftermath of his fight with Ivan Drago, Rocky Balboa is diagnosed with brain damage and is forced to retire from the ring. Additionally, the Balboa fortune is all gone due to an unscrupulous accountant. Rocky's family returns to their old neighborhood and Adrian returns to the pet store she used to work at, while (in a subplot) Rocky (Robert) Jr. (played by Sylvester Stallone's real son Sage) deals with bullying at his school and Rocky re-opens Mickey's old gym. While training other boxers, Rocky meets a young, hungry boxer named Tommy Gunn (played by real-life fighter Tommy Morrison) and begins training him which results in a strained relationship with Robert. Unfortunately, as Tommy begins his rise to fame under Rocky's wing, a sleazy fight promoter named George Washington Duke convinces Tommy that Rocky is holding him back and Tommy leaves Rocky for Duke. After Tommy wins the heavyweight title, he makes a short speech thanking Duke, and is met with jeers and the familiar chant of "Rocky" from the crowd. Seething from this insult, as well as being called by publicists as "Rocky's robot" and being told that he's "no Rocky Balboa", Tommy decides to seek out his former mentor for a final showdown. Rocky starts to walk away from the public challenge, but Paulie decides to let Tommy have a piece of his mind about how Tommy has treated Rocky, and Tommy proceeds to punch Paulie. Rocky then challenges Tommy outside and the two proceed in a violent bare-knuckle street brawl, which Rocky wins. Rocky then proceeds to punch Duke for harassing him. In the end, Rocky and Robert reconcile as they run up the steps as father and son.

Rocky Balboa (2006)

In Rocky Balboa, twenty years have passed since his final fight with his former protégé, Tommy "The Machine" Gunn. Long retired, Rocky Balboa still staggers around an ever-changing world; his son is grown and distant, Paulie is working back at the meat plant, and Rocky's wife Adrian has died. Rocky has opened a restaurant named after his wife, which he stocks with mementos of his prime as he tells his old fight stories to customers. But when a computer-simulated fight on ESPN depicting a bout between a young Rocky Balboa and the current champion, Mason Dixon (Antonio Tarver) reignites interest in the faded boxer, Rocky discovers he has not lost his fighting spirit and considers an opportunity to prove himself in the ring again. Rocky almost wins the fight but loses in a split decision just like the first film. Rocky is last seen visiting his wife's grave saying, "Yo Adrian, we did it".

Creed (2015)

Adonis "Donnie" Johnson (Michael B. Jordan), the illegitimate son of the late former heavyweight champion Apollo Creed, tracks down Rocky Balboa at Adrian's and asks Rocky to become his trainer. Rocky is reluctant, but eventually agrees. When word gets out that Donnie is Creed's illegitimate son, the handlers of world light heavyweight champion "Pretty" Ricky Conlan, who is forced into retirement by an impending prison term, offer to make Donnie the latter's final challenger—provided that he change his name to Adonis Creed. Donnie balks at first, wanting to forge his own legacy, but he eventually agrees. While helping Donnie train, Rocky learns he has non-Hodgkin's lymphoma. He is initially unwilling to undergo chemotherapy because it wasn't enough to save Adrian from ovarian cancer. Donnie persuades Rocky to seek treatment and continues training while Rocky recovers. In a battle reminiscent of Apollo and Rocky's first fight, Donnie fights Conlan in Conlan's hometown of Liverpool and surprises almost everyone by going the distance and pushing Conlan to his limit. Conlan wins by split decision, but Donnie wins the respect of Conlan and the crowd, with Conlan calling Donnie the future of the light heavyweight division. Returning to Philadelphia, Donnie and a recovering Rocky both make their way up the Philadelphia Museum steps and look at the skyline.

Creed II (2018)

Three years after losing the fight to "Pretty" Ricky Conlan, Adonis Johnson Creed wins the World Heavyweight Championship and proposes to his girlfriend, Bianca Taylor (Tessa Thompson). Meanwhile, three decades since the death of Apollo Creed and his loss to Rocky Balboa, Ivan Drago is training his son, Viktor Drago (Florian Munteanu), to reclaim their honor by having Viktor publicly challenge Adonis for the World Heavyweight Title. Rocky is reluctant to train Adonis, fearing Adonis will meet the same fate as his father, but Adonis accepts the challenge without him and is badly injured during the fight. Because of Viktor's disqualification, Adonis retains the title. Viktor demands a rematch, while he is being promoted by his father's supporters who originally abandoned Drago, including Drago's ex-wife, Ludmilla (Brigitte Nielsen). Viktor is subjected to vicious training sessions in preparation for the rematch. Rocky comes to Adonis' aid and decides to train him in the Southern California desert, with a different tactic for Adonis to take in Viktor's powerful punches. The rematch is set in Moscow, and Adonis is able to take Viktor's powerful punches, while leaving Viktor exhausted. Viktor's supporters and his mother leave during the fight with doubt that Viktor will win. Drago seeing his son taking Adonis’ punches without fighting back, throws in the towel and assures his son that he is more important to him and that he will not abandon him like he was. While Rocky later reunites with his son, Robert (Milo Ventimiglia) and meets his grandson, Adonis goes to his late father's grave, making peace with his late father and honoring his legacy.

Creed III (2023)

In December 2018, Sylvester Stallone confirmed that there are ongoing discussions regarding a third Creed film. That same month, professional boxer Deontay Wilder announced plans to begin a career in acting, stating specifically that he wants to play James "Clubber" Lang's son in Creed III. Stallone and Michael B. Jordan expressed mutual interest in such a character featuring in the plot of the next installment, while Stallone stated that he wasn't opposed to the casting choice. Creed III was later officially confirmed to be in development. Producers expressed interest in having Jordan serve as director, with Irwin Winkler stating that he had personally offered the position to the actor.

In February 2020, Zach Baylin signed on as screenwriter with Jordan confirmed to reprise his role as Adonis "Donnie" Creed. By October of the same year, Jordan entered early negotiations to be the film's director in addition to his starring role. By March 2021 Jordan officially signed on as director of the project, marking the directorial debut for the star as a filmmaker, with a script co-written by Zach Baylin and Keenan Coogler, from an original story written by Ryan Coogler. Irwin Winkler, Charles Winkler, William Chartoff, David Winkler, Jonathan Glickman, Jordan and Ryan Coogler serve as co-producers. Stallone later announced that he will not appear as Balboa in the film, though he is still involved as a producer. The project is a joint-venture production between MGM, Chartoff-Winkler Productions, Proximity Media, and United Artists Releasing. Creed III was released on March 3, 2023.

Future

Drago (TBA)
In November 2021, Dolph Lundgren revealed that there are developments for a film centered around his character Ivan Drago. By July 2022, the project was officially announced by MGM with Robert Lawton serving as screenwriter on the project. Lawton had previously completed a spec script for a movie pitch centered around the making of the first Rocky film. Though the studio did not choose to develop that script, studio executives were impressed enough to hire the writer for the Drago film. The screenplay is stated to be centered around Ivan Drago's backstory.

The announcement of the spin-off movie was met with criticism by franchise creator, Stallone. He stated that, while he has tried to attain part of the rights to a franchise he was instrumental in creating, the producers have been "exploiting" his characters while trying to keep him out of the creative team. Following Stallone's response, Lundgren stated that he immediately reached out to his friend, explaining that when the project had been presented to him he had been informed that Stallone would be involved as a producer, as well as appearing in the movie, having been unaware Stallone had not yet been approached on announcing the spin-off; the actor further stated that the project had yet to be officially green-lit. While Stallone's reactions were perceived as uncharacteristic to his public image, he later stated that he has since discussed the potential movie with Lundgren.

In March 2023, it was reported that it was unclear whether the film would be made.

Creed IV (TBA)
In February 2023, Jordan announced that a fourth Creed film was in development, in which he would be reprising the role of Adonis "Donnie" Creed.

Untitled seventh Rocky film (TBA)
In May 2019 at the Cannes Film Festival, Sylvester Stallone said that he had another story about Rocky Balboa. By July, Stallone confirmed that a sequel/follow-up to the current film series is in development. The project will be a joint-production venture between Winkler Films Production and MGM. Stallone will serve as writer in addition to starring in the film.

Conceptualized as an epilogue story, the film is said to be about Rocky befriending a young fighter who is a foreigner, stuck illegally in the United States. Stallone states: "Rocky meets a young, angry person who got stuck in this country when he comes to see his sister. He takes him into his life, and unbelievable adventures begin, and they wind up south of the border. It's very, very timely". By May 2020, Stallone said that he is still working on the film, though it has not yet been officially green-lit by the studio. However in a November 2021 Instagram post, Stallone expressed doubt about the film being greenlit, due to his souring relationship with producer Irwin Winkler. In November 2022, Stallone confirmed that the studio wants another Rocky film, but that negotiations to attain part of the rights to the character from the producers stalled development. He further stated that he is writing the script and that if the studio likes his work, the film will be made.

In February 2023, Stallone posted the first page of the script on a since deleted Instagram post, showing his fans a glimpse at the work he had put into the project. The filmmaker once again expressed doubt that the film will be produced, owing to his feud with Winkler over rights to the franchise.

Creed spin-off films 
In February 2023, Michael B. Jordan announced that a variety of possible spin-off projects to Creed were being actively discussed for potential development.

Television

Rocky prequel series 
In July 2019, Sylvester Stallone announced that there are "ongoing discussions" about a Rocky prequel television series, with the project intended to premiere on a streaming service platform. Film series producer, Irwin Winkler however, is said to be hesitant in making a television series with concerns regarding how the story would translate to television. As an official production start has not yet been announced, Stallone stated: "There was some conflict there, yes. ...so there was a big bone of contention".

In March 2021, Stallone revealed he had started working on the script for a prequel series that will take place during the 1960s, with intention for the show to be developed as a streaming exclusive with multiple seasons, each consisting of ten episodes. By May, Stallone said that though there are "certain complications" with developing the series, but that he would "keep punching". Despite this setback, later that month as the acquisition of MGM by Amazon for $8.45 billion had initiated, Mike Hopkins (Senior Vice President of Amazon Prime Video and Amazon Studios) identified the Rocky franchise as one of the major assets in the purchase. He also stated that the "value behind this deal is the treasure trove of IP in the deep catalog that we plan to reimagine and develop together with MGM's talented team".

In November 2022, Stallone confirmed that his prequel script which was previously turned down by producers is once again in development for a streaming company. He stated that Amazon's new inclusion in the franchise, is responsible for the progress of the project. In March 2023, it was reported that Amazon intends to expand the franchise, with various projects in development including Stallone's previously identified series. Stallone is expected to be involved with its development.

Creed spinoff projects 
In March 2023, it was announced that Michael B. Jordan would be involved with expanding the franchise with additional Creed spin-offs on Amazon Prime Video. These projects being discussed include an anime series, a live-action series, and a project centered around the daughter of Adonis named Amara Creed.

Main cast and characters

Additional crew and production details

Reception

Box office performance

Critical and public response

Accolades

At the 49th Academy Awards, Rocky was nominated for ten Academy Awards. Sylvester Stallone was nominated for the Academy Award for Best Actor, and Best Original Screenplay, with Talia Shire also being nominated for Best Actress, and both Burgess Meredith and Burt Young being nominated for Best Supporting Actor. "Gonna Fly Now" was nominated for Best Original Song, and Rocky itself was nominated for Best Sound Editing, and won Best Picture, Best Director for John G. Avildsen, and Best Film Editing. At the 55th Academy Awards, the song "Eye of the Tiger" from Rocky III was nominated for Best Original Song.

On December 7, 2010, Stallone was inducted into the International Boxing Hall of Fame and Museum, for paying tribute to boxers in writing and creating the underdog character of Rocky. In January 2016, Stallone won the Golden Globe Award for Best Supporting Actor for his role in Creed. At the 88th Academy Awards, Stallone was nominated for the Academy Award for Best Supporting Actor for his performance in Creed, the film's only nomination. In total, the Rocky series has received twelve Academy Awards nominations, winning three.

Music

Soundtracks

Singles
 "Gonna Fly Now"
 "Eye of the Tiger"
 "Burning Heart"
 "Heart's on Fire"
 "Living in America"
 "Shea Butter Baby"

Other media

Musical

A Broadway musical was written by Stephen Flaherty and Lynn Ahrens (lyrics and music), with the book by Thomas Meehan, based on the film. The musical premiered in Hamburg, Germany in October 2012. Performances commenced at the Winter Garden Theater on Broadway on February 11, 2014, and officially opened on March 13.

Novelizations
 Rocky: Upon the first film, a paperback novelization of the screenplay was written by Stallone and Rosalyn Drexler under the pseudonym Julia Sorel, and published by Ballantine Books in 1976.
 Rocky II: A novelization written by Sylvester Stallone, was published by Ballantine Books in 1979. The book is a first-person narrative told from the perspective of Rocky Balboa.
 Rocky III: A novelization written by Robert E. Hoban was published by Ballantine Books in 1982.
 Rocky IV: A novelization written by Sylvester Stallone, was published by Ballantine Books in 1985.
 Rocky the Musical:  A script written by Thomas Meehan and Sylvester Stallone, was published by Hal Leonard in 2014.

Video games
Various licensed video games for various arcade and home console systems were released including:
 Rocky Super Action Boxing – based on Rocky III and released in 1983.
 Rocky – based on Rocky, Rocky II, Rocky III and Rocky IV. Released in 1987.
 Rocky – based on Rocky, Rocky II, Rocky III, Rocky IV and Rocky V. Released in 2002.
 Rocky Legends – based on Rocky, Rocky II, Rocky III and Rocky IV. Released in 2004.
Rocky Balboa – based on Rocky Balboa and released in 2007.
 ROCKY™ – A mobile video game, based on Rocky-Rocky Balboa and released in 2016.
 Creed: Rise to Glory – Based on Creed and released in 2018.
 Big Rumble Boxing: Creed Champions – based on Rocky-Creed II and released in 2021.

Documentaries
Rocky is featured in the 2017 documentary John G. Avildsen: King of the Underdogs about Academy Award-winning Rocky director John G. Avildsen, directed and produced by Derek Wayne Johnson.

Stallone later hand-picked Johnson to direct and produce a documentary on the making of the original Rocky, entitled 40 Years of Rocky: The Birth of a Classic, which was released in 2020. The documentary features Stallone narrating behind-the-scenes footage from the making of the film.

Director's cut 
A director's cut edition of Rocky IV was originally scheduled to commemorate its 35th anniversary. Ongoing editing ultimately pushed the release date, with Stallone finishing his editing sometime in January 2021. In all, approximately 38 minutes of previously unreleased footage were added to the film, including significant extensions of both fight scenes and the Apollo Creed funeral scene. One reported cut was that of Paulie's robot. Robert Doornick, founder of International Robotics and the voice of the robot, commented that Stallone cut all of the robot scenes in the director's cut to save money on royalty fees that were given to Doornick in the original cut.

The cut missed its original November 27, 2020 release, though by February 2021 Stallone stated that they were in the final stages of completing the project. His cut of the film was finished in April. This version had a one-night limited theatrical release on November 11, 2021 and was additionally released in digital formats the following day.

In popular culture
The 2016 film Chuck depicts Chuck Wepner, his 1975 title fight with the heavyweight champion, Muhammad Ali, and the fight's influence on the screenplay for Rocky.

Canceled projects
In the January 2022 issue of Empire, published in November 2021, Ralph Macchio revealed that he had previously been approached about a potential Rocky and The Karate Kid crossover film in 2012, to be directed by John G. Avildsen which would follow Daniel LaRusso's daughter and Milo Ventimiglia's Rocky Balboa Jr. "get[ting] together and open[ing] a dojo". Describing the concept as "awful", Macchio declined reprising his role and the project subsequently entered development hell, before being abandoned in favor of Creed and Cobra Kai individually.

References

 
Film series introduced in 1976
English-language films
United Artists films
Metro-Goldwyn-Mayer franchises
American boxing films
Sports film series
Italian-American culture in Philadelphia
Film franchises
Film franchises introduced in 1976